Arango is a surname. Notable people with the surname include:

Alfredo Arango (footballer) (1945–2005), Colombian footballer
Alicia Arango (born 1958), Colombian politician and businesswoman
Andrés Pastrana Arango (born 1954), Colombian politician
Ángel Arango (1926–2013), Cuban science fiction writer
Carlos Arango (1928-2014), Colombian footballer
Celso Arango (born 1968), Spanish psychiatrist
Cristian Arango (born 1995), Colombian footballer 
Daniel Arango, Colombian-born American artist
Débora Arango (1907–2005), Colombian artist
Emiliana Arango (born 2000), Colombian junior tennis player
Gonzalo Arango (1931–1976), Colombian poet, journalist and philosopher
Jaime Jaramillo Arango (1897–1962), Colombian academic, diplomat and politician
Jerónimo Arango (1927–2020), Mexican businessman
Johan Arango (born 1991), Colombian footballer
Jorge Arango (1917–2007), Colombian-born US architect
Juan Arango (born 1980), Venezuelan footballer
Juan Andrés Arango (born 1976), Colombian-Canadian film director
Julián Arango (born 1969), Colombian television actor
Julio Arango (born 1950), Colombian swimmer
Julio Franco Arango (1914−1980), Colombian Roman Catholic bishop
Mónica Arango (born 1992), Colombian swimmer
Octavio Betancourt Arango (1928–2017), Colombian Roman Catholic prelate
Oscar Arango (born 1965), Colombian fencer
Ramon Arango, LSU historian
Ricardo Adolfo de la Guardia Arango (1899–1969), Panamanian politician
Roberto Arango, Cuban American politician 
Rogelio Arango (born 1959), Colombian racing cyclist
Salvador Arango (born 1944), Colombian sculptor
Silvio Arango (born 1988), Colombian footballer
Tim Arango, American journalist